Hamilton Everhart Farm was a historic farm complex located near Midway, Davidson County, North Carolina. The complex, built about 1860, included a two-story log house with Greek Revival style design elements, a free-standing log kitchen, a double pen log barn, and a small log potato house. It has been demolished.

It was added to the National Register of Historic Places in 1984.

References

Log houses in the United States
Farms on the National Register of Historic Places in North Carolina
Greek Revival houses in North Carolina
Commercial buildings completed in 1860
Houses in Davidson County, North Carolina
National Register of Historic Places in Davidson County, North Carolina
Log buildings and structures on the National Register of Historic Places in North Carolina